Hibbertia rupicola is a species of flowering plant in the family Dilleniaceae and is endemic to the south-west of Western Australia. It is a shrub with densely-clustered, linear leaves and yellow flowers with nine to seventeen stamens arranged around three glabrous carpels.

Description
There are nine to seventeen stamens in three groups, two free from the others, all arranged around three glabrous carpels that each contain a single ovule. Flowering occurs from March to April or from September to December.

Taxonomy
This species was first formally described in 1920 by Spencer Le Marchant Moore who gave it the name Candollea rupicola in the Journal of the Linnean Society, Botany from specimens collected near Bruce Rock by Frederick Stoward. In 1931, Charles Gardner changed the name to Hibbertia rupicola. The specific epithet (rupicola) means "rock inhabitant".

Distribution and habitat
Hibbertia rupicola grows in woodland, mallee, shrubland or heath and occurs in the Avon Wheatbelt, Coolgardie, Esperance Plains, Geraldton Sandplains, Jarrah Forest, Mallee and Murchison biogeographic regions of south-western Western Australia.

Conservation status
This hibbertia is classified as "not threatened" by the Government of Western Australia Department of Biodiversity, Conservation and Attractions.

See also
List of Hibbertia species

References

rupicola
Flora of Western Australia
Plants described in 1920